This discography aims to include all published recordings featuring the conducting of Victor de Sabata.

Sorted by composer and work

Barber

Beethoven

Berlioz

Brahms

De Sabata

Debussy

Dukas

Dvořák

Franck

Ghedini

Giordano

Glazunov

Kodály

Mosolov

Mozart

Puccini

Rachmaninoff

Ravel

Respighi

Rossini

Schumann

Sibelius

Richard Strauss

Stravinsky

Verdi

Wagner

Wolf-Ferrari

Sorted by date

1930s

1930

1933

1936

1937

1938

1939

1940s

1940

1941

1946

1947

1948

1949

1950s

1950

1951

1952

1953

1954

References
  Archipel ARPCD 0027-3, booklet notes
  Nuova Era 2210, Booklet note. See also 
  Nuova Era 2297, Booklet note. See also 
  Nuova Era 2319, Booklet note. See also 
  Testament SBT 1108, booklet notes
  Urania URN 22.105, booklet notes
  Urania URN 22.105, booklet notes
  Urania URN 22.142, booklet notes
  Pearl GEMS 0054, booklet notes
  "Rehearsal" consists of brief remarks by de Sabata followed by a complete uninterrupted runthrough

Discographies of classical conductors
Discographies of Italian artists